New York's 49th State Assembly district is one of the 150 districts in the New York State Assembly. It has been represented by Lester Chang since 2023.

Geography
District 49 is in Brooklyn. It contains portions of Dyker Heights, Sunset Park, Borough Park and Bensonhurst.

2010s 
District 49 is in Brooklyn. It contains portions of Dyker Heights, Sunset Park, and Bensonhurst.

Recent election results

2022 
Due to a residency challenge to the election winner, Lester Chang, this election may be voided and a special election called.

2020

2018

2016

2014

2012

2010

References

Politics of Brooklyn
49